Svijany is a municipality and village in Liberec District in the Liberec Region of the Czech Republic. It has about 300 inhabitants. It is known for the Svijany Brewery.

Geography
It lies in the Jičín Uplands. The municipality is situated on the right bank of the Jizera River, whivh forms the southern municipal border.

History

The first written mention of Svijany is from 1345, when the village was owned by a Cistercian monastery in Mnichovo Hradiště. In 1565, Svijany was acquired by Jaroslav of Wartenberg, who had built a Renaissance castle here. Upon Jaroslav's death in 1602, the village passed to Joachim Andreas von Schlick. As a rebel against Habsburg rule of Bohemia, he was executed in 1621, and in 1623, Svijany came under control of Albrecht of Wallenstein. His family owned Svijany until 1814. From 1820, the village was in possession of the Rohan family, who were its last aristocratic owners.

In 1945, the castle and the brewery were confiscated and nationalized. The castle was rebuilt into apartments and gradually fell into disrepair.

Economy

Svijany is known for the Svijany Brewery, which was founded in 1564. It is one of the oldest continuously operating breweries in the Czech Republic.

Transport
The D10 motorway runs through Svijany.

Sights
The most notable monument is the Svijany Castle. It was built in 1578, and rebuilt and extended during the rule of the Waldstein family. Since 1998, the castle has been owned by the brewery, which had reconstructed it. Today the castle is open to the public, contains several exhibitions, and is also used as a hotel and restaurant.

References

External links

Villages in Liberec District